Huc or HUC may refer to:

 Évariste Régis Huc (1813–1860), French Roman Catholic missionary in China, Tartary and Tibet
 Hebrew Union College, the oldest extant Jewish seminary in the Americas
 Honker Union, a hacker group in China
 Hospitais da Universidade de Coimbra, a university hospital in Coimbra, Portugal
 Hydrologic unit code, a hydrological code used by the United States Geological Survey
 Huc, a village in Todirești, Vaslui, Romania
 Highly urbanized city, a legal class of cities in the Philippines
 Huc, a hydrogenase in bacteria